Pernille Højmark (born 21 May 1960) is a Danish actress. She has appeared in more than thirty films since 1985.

Filmography

References

External links 

1960 births
Living people
Danish film actresses